Mount Alexandra is a mountain rising to  at the south side of the head of Garwood Glacier in the Denton Hills, Scott Coast. It was named by the New Zealand Geographic Board after Jane Alexandra (1829–92), an early botanist with an interest in lower plants; born in Calcutta, she came to New Zealand in 1862.

References
 

Mountains of Victoria Land
Scott Coast